Just Seventeen, often referred to as J-17, was a fortnightly magazine aimed at teenage girls, published by Emap from October 1983 to April 2004. A special preview edition was given away free with sister magazine Smash Hits on 13 October 1983, with the first issue published the week after on 20 October (thereby alternating weeks with Smash Hits). It had become a weekly publication by early 1986. It quickly became the UK's market-leading teen-girl magazine until the launch of Sugar in 1994, after which sales began to fall. In 1997, the magazine was changed to a monthly format in response to declining circulation, and the magazine was finally closed in 2004 after losing a third of its readership.

References

Biweekly magazines published in the United Kingdom
Defunct magazines published in the United Kingdom
Lifestyle magazines published in the United Kingdom
Magazines established in 1983
Magazines disestablished in 2004
Magazines published in London
Monthly magazines published in the United Kingdom
Teen magazines